77th NYFCC Awards
January 9, 2012

Best Picture: 
The Artist

The 77th New York Film Critics Circle Awards, honoring the best in film for 2011, were announced on 29 November 2011 and presented on 9 January 2012.

Winners

Best Film:
The Artist
Runners-up: Melancholia and Hugo
Best Director:
Michel Hazanavicius – The Artist
Runners-up: Martin Scorsese – Hugo and Lars von Trier – Melancholia
Best Actor:
Brad Pitt – Moneyball and The Tree of Life
Runners-up: Michael Fassbender – Shame and Jean Dujardin – The Artist
Best Actress:
Meryl Streep – The Iron Lady
Runners-up: Michelle Williams – My Week with Marilyn and Kirsten Dunst – Melancholia
Best Supporting Actor:
Albert Brooks – Drive
Runners-up: Christopher Plummer – Beginners and Viggo Mortensen – A Dangerous Method
Best Supporting Actress:
Jessica Chastain – The Help, Take Shelter, and The Tree of Life
Runners-up: Carey Mulligan – Shame and Vanessa Redgrave – Coriolanus
Best Screenplay:
Aaron Sorkin and Steven Zaillian – Moneyball
Best Cinematography:
Emmanuel Lubezki – The Tree of Life
Best Foreign Language Film:
A Separation (Jodaeiye Nader az Simin) • Iran
Runner-up: Incendies • Canada
Best Non-Fiction Film:
Cave of Forgotten Dreams
Best First Film:
J. C. Chandor – Margin Call
Special Award:
Raúl Ruiz

References

External links
 2011 Awards

New York Film Critics Circle Awards
2011 film awards
2011 in American cinema
2011 awards in the United States
2011 in New York City